Rosemary Sparrow (born 6 July 1925) was a British alpine skier. She competed in two events at the 1948 Winter Olympics.

References

1925 births
Living people
British female alpine skiers
Olympic alpine skiers of Great Britain
Alpine skiers at the 1948 Winter Olympics
Place of birth missing (living people)